Myasthenia gravis (MG) is a long-term neuromuscular junction disease that leads to varying degrees of skeletal muscle weakness. The most commonly affected muscles are those of the eyes, face, and swallowing. It can result in double vision, drooping eyelids, trouble talking, and trouble walking. Onset can be sudden. Those affected often have a large thymus or develop a thymoma.

Myasthenia gravis is an autoimmune disease of the neuro-muscular junction which results from antibodies that block or destroy nicotinic acetylcholine receptors (AChR) at the junction between the nerve and muscle. This prevents nerve impulses from triggering muscle contractions. Most cases are due to immunoglobulin G1 (IgG1) and IgG3 antibodies that attack AChR in the postsynaptic membrane, causing complement-mediated damage and muscle weakness. Rarely, an inherited genetic defect in the neuromuscular junction results in a similar condition known as congenital myasthenia. Babies of mothers with myasthenia may have symptoms during their first few months of life, known as neonatal myasthenia. Diagnosis can be supported by blood tests for specific antibodies, the edrophonium test, or a nerve conduction study.

MG is generally treated with medications known as acetylcholinesterase inhibitors, such as neostigmine and pyridostigmine. Immunosuppressants, such as prednisone or azathioprine, may also be used. The surgical removal of the thymus may improve symptoms in certain cases. Plasmapheresis and high-dose intravenous immunoglobulin may be used during sudden flares of the condition. If the breathing muscles become significantly weak, mechanical ventilation may be required. Once intubated acetylcholinesterase inhibitors may be temporarily held to reduce airway secretions.

MG affects 50 to 200 per million people. It is newly diagnosed in three to 30 per million people each year. Diagnosis has become more common due to increased awareness. MG most commonly occurs in women under the age of 40 and in men over the age of 60. It is uncommon in children. With treatment, most of those affected lead relatively normal lives and have a normal life expectancy. The word is from the Greek mys, "muscle" and astheneia "weakness", and the Latin gravis, "serious".

Signs and symptoms
The initial, main symptom in MG is painless weakness of specific muscles, not fatigue. The muscle weakness becomes progressively worse during periods of physical activity and improves after periods of rest. Typically, the weakness and fatigue are worse toward the end of the day. MG generally starts with ocular (eye) weakness; it might then progress to a more severe generalized form, characterized by weakness in the extremities or in muscles that govern basic life functions.

Eyes
In about two-thirds of individuals, the initial symptom of MG is related to the muscles around the eye. Eyelid drooping (ptosis may occur due to weakness of m. levator palpebrae superioris) and double vision (diplopia, due to weakness of the extraocular muscles). Eye symptoms tend to get worse when watching television, reading, or driving, particularly in bright conditions. Consequently, some affected individuals choose to wear sunglasses. The term "ocular myasthenia gravis" describes a subtype of MG where muscle weakness is confined to the eyes, i.e. extraocular muscles, m. levator palpebrae superioris, and m. orbicularis oculi. Typically, this subtype evolves into generalized MG, usually after a few years.

Eating
The weakness of the muscles involved in swallowing may lead to swallowing difficulty (dysphagia). Typically, this means that some food may be left in the mouth after an attempt to swallow, or food and liquids may regurgitate into the nose rather than go down the throat (velopharyngeal insufficiency). Weakness of the muscles that move the jaw (muscles of mastication) may cause difficulty chewing. In individuals with MG, chewing tends to become more tiring when chewing tough, fibrous foods. Difficulty in swallowing, chewing, and speaking is the first symptom in about one-sixth of individuals.

Speaking
Weakness of the muscles involved in speaking may lead to dysarthria and hypophonia. Speech may be slow and slurred, or have a nasal quality. In some cases, a singing hobby or profession must be abandoned.

Head and neck
Due to weakness of the muscles of facial expression and muscles of mastication, facial weakness may manifest as the inability to hold the mouth closed (the "hanging jaw sign") and as a snarling expression when attempting to smile. With drooping eyelids, facial weakness may make the individual appear sleepy or sad. Difficulty in holding the head upright may occur.

Other
The muscles that control breathing and limb movements can also be affected; rarely do these present as the first symptoms of MG, but develop over months to years. In a myasthenic crisis, a paralysis of the respiratory muscles occurs, necessitating assisted ventilation to sustain life. Crises may be triggered by various biological stressors such as infection, fever, an adverse reaction to medication, or emotional stress.

Pathophysiology
MG is an autoimmune synaptopathy. The disorder occurs when the immune system malfunctions and generates antibodies that attack the body's tissues. The antibodies in MG attack a normal human protein, the nicotinic acetylcholine receptor, or a related protein called MuSK, a muscle-specific kinase. Other, less frequent antibodies are found against LRP4, agrin, and titin proteins.

Human leukocyte antigen haplotypes are associated with increased susceptibility to myasthenia gravis and other autoimmune disorders. Relatives of people with myasthenia gravis have a higher percentage of other immune disorders.

The thymus gland cells form part of the body's immune system. In those with myasthenia gravis, the thymus gland is large and abnormal. It sometimes contains clusters of immune cells that indicate lymphoid hyperplasia, and the thymus gland may give wrong instructions to immune cells.

In pregnancy
For women who are pregnant and already have MG, in a third of cases, they have been known to experience an exacerbation of their symptoms, and in those cases, it usually occurs in the first trimester of pregnancy. Signs and symptoms in pregnant mothers tend to improve during the second and third trimesters. Complete remission can occur in some mothers. Immunosuppressive therapy should be maintained throughout pregnancy, as this reduces the chance of neonatal muscle weakness, and controls the mother's myasthenia.

About 10–20% of infants with mothers affected by the condition are born with transient neonatal myasthenia (TNM), which generally produces feeding and respiratory difficulties that develop about 12 hours to several days after birth. A child with TNM typically responds very well to acetylcholinesterase inhibitors, and the condition generally resolves over a period of three weeks, as the antibodies diminish, and generally does not result in any complications. Very rarely, an infant can be born with arthrogryposis multiplex congenita, secondary to profound intrauterine weakness. This is due to maternal antibodies that target an infant's acetylcholine receptors. In some cases, the mother remains asymptomatic.

Diagnosis
MG can be difficult to diagnose, as the symptoms can be subtle and hard to distinguish from both normal variants and other neurological disorders.

Three types of myasthenic symptoms in children can be distinguished:
 Transient neonatal myasthenia occurs in 10 to 15% of babies born to mothers afflicted with the disorder, and disappears after a few weeks.
 Congenital myasthenia, the rarest form, occurs when genes are present from both parents.
 Juvenile myasthenia gravis is most common in females.

Congenital myasthenias cause muscle weakness and fatigability similar to those of MG.
The signs of congenital myasthenia usually are present in the first years of childhood, although they may not be recognized until adulthood.

Classification

When diagnosed with MG, a person is assessed for his or her neurological status and the level of illness is established. This is usually done using the accepted Myasthenia Gravis Foundation of America Clinical Classification scale.

Physical examination
During a physical examination to check for MG, a doctor might ask the person to perform repetitive movements. For instance, the doctor may ask one to look at a fixed point for 30 seconds and to relax the muscles of the forehead, because a person with MG and ptosis of the eyes might be involuntarily using the forehead muscles to compensate for the weakness in the eyelids. The clinical examiner might also try to elicit the "curtain sign" in a person by holding one of the person's eyes open, which in the case of MG will lead the other eye to close.

Blood tests
If the diagnosis is suspected, serology can be performed:
 One test is for antibodies against the acetylcholine receptor; the test has a reasonable sensitivity of 80–96%, but in ocular myasthenia, the sensitivity falls to 50%.
 A proportion of the people without antibodies against the acetylcholine receptor have antibodies against the MuSK protein.
 In specific situations, testing is performed for Lambert-Eaton syndrome.

Electrodiagnostics

Muscle fibers of people with MG are easily fatigued, which the repetitive nerve stimulation test can help diagnose. In single-fiber electromyography, which is considered to be the most sensitive (although not the most specific) test for MG, a thin needle electrode is inserted into different areas of a particular muscle to record the action potentials from several samplings of different individual muscle fibers. Two muscle fibers belonging to the same motor unit are identified, and the temporal variability in their firing patterns is measured. Frequency and proportion of particular abnormal action potential patterns, called "jitter" and "blocking", are diagnostic. Jitter refers to the abnormal variation in the time interval between action potentials of adjacent muscle fibers in the same motor unit. Blocking refers to the failure of nerve impulses to elicit action potentials in adjacent muscle fibers of the same motor unit.

Ice test
Applying ice for 2–5 minutes to the muscles reportedly has a sensitivity and specificity of 76.9% and 98.3%, respectively, for the identification of MG. Acetylcholinesterase is thought to be inhibited at the lower temperature, which is the basis for this diagnostic test. This generally is performed on the eyelids when ptosis is present and is deemed positive if a ≥2-mm rise in the eyelid occurs after the ice is removed.

Edrophonium test
This test requires the intravenous administration of edrophonium chloride or neostigmine, drugs that block the breakdown of acetylcholine by cholinesterase (acetylcholinesterase inhibitors). This test is no longer typically performed, as its use can lead to life-threatening bradycardia (slow heart rate) which requires immediate emergency attention. Production of edrophonium was discontinued in 2008.

Imaging
A chest X-ray may identify widening of the mediastinum suggestive of thymoma, but computed tomography or magnetic resonance imaging (MRI) are more sensitive ways to identify thymomas and are generally done for this reason. MRI of the cranium and orbits may also be performed to exclude compressive and inflammatory lesions of the cranial nerves and ocular muscles.

Pulmonary function test
The forced vital capacity may be monitored at intervals to detect increasing muscular weakness. Acutely, negative inspiratory force may be used to determine adequacy of ventilation; it is performed on those individuals with MG.

Management
Treatment is by medication and/or surgery. Medication consists mainly of acetylcholinesterase inhibitors to directly improve muscle function and immunosuppressant drugs to reduce the autoimmune process. Thymectomy is a surgical method to treat MG.

Medication

Worsening may occur with medication such as fluoroquinolones, aminoglycosides, and magnesium. About 10% of people with generalized MG are considered treatment-refractory. Autologous hematopoietic stem cell transplantation (HSCT) is sometimes used in severe, treatment-refractory MG. Available data provide preliminary evidence that HSCT can be an effective therapeutic option in carefully selected cases.

Efgartigimod alfa was approved for medical use in the United States in December 2021.

Acetylcholinesterase inhibitors
Acetylcholinesterase inhibitors can provide symptomatic benefit and may not fully remove a person's weakness from MG. While they might not fully remove all symptoms of MG, they still may allow a person the ability to perform normal daily activities. Usually, acetylcholinesterase inhibitors are started at a low dose and increased until the desired result is achieved. If taken 30 minutes before a meal, symptoms will be mild during eating, which is helpful for those who have difficulty swallowing due to their illness. Another medication used for MG, atropine, can reduce the muscarinic side effects of acetylcholinesterase inhibitors. Pyridostigmine is a relatively long-acting drug (when compared to other cholinergic agonists), with a half-life around four hours with relatively few side effects. Generally, it is discontinued in those who are being mechanically ventilated, as it is known to increase the amount of salivary secretions. A few high-quality studies have directly compared cholinesterase inhibitors with other treatments (or placebo); their practical benefit may be so significant that conducting studies in which they would be withheld from some people would be difficult.

Immune suppressants
The steroid prednisone might also be used to achieve a better result, but it can lead to the worsening of symptoms and takes weeks to achieve its maximal effectiveness. Due to the myriad symptoms that steroid treatments can cause, it is not the preferred method of treatment. Other immune suppressing medications may also be used including rituximab or azathioprine.

Plasmapheresis and IVIG
If the myasthenia is serious (myasthenic crisis), plasmapheresis can be used to remove the putative antibodies from the circulation. Also, intravenous immunoglobulins (IVIGs) can be used to bind the circulating antibodies. Both of these treatments have relatively short-lived benefits, typically measured in weeks, and often are associated with high costs, which make them prohibitive; they are generally reserved for when MG requires hospitalization.

Surgery
As thymomas are seen in 10% of all people with the MG, they are often given a chest X-ray and CT scan to evaluate their need for surgical removal of their thymus glands and any cancerous tissue that may be present. Even if surgery is performed to remove a thymoma, it generally does not lead to the remission of MG. Surgery in the case of MG involves the removal of the thymus, although in 2013, no clear benefit was indicated except in the presence of a thymoma. A 2016 randomized, controlled trial, however, found some benefits.

Physical measures
People with MG should be educated regarding the fluctuating nature of their symptoms, including weakness and exercise-induced fatigue. Exercise participation should be encouraged with frequent rest. In people with generalized MG, some evidence indicates a partial home program including training in diaphragmatic breathing, pursed-lip breathing, and interval-based muscle therapy may improve respiratory muscle strength, chest wall mobility, respiratory pattern, and respiratory endurance.

Medical imaging
In people with myasthenia gravis, older forms of iodinated contrast used for medical imaging have caused an increased risk of exacerbation of the disease, but modern forms have no immediate increased risk.

Prognosis
The prognosis of people with MG is generally good, as is quality of life, when given very good treatment. Monitoring of a person with MG is very important, as at least 20% of people diagnosed with it will experience a myasthenic crisis within two years of their diagnosis, requiring rapid medical intervention. Generally, the most disabling period of MG might be years after the initial diagnosis. In the early 1900s, 70% of detected cases died from lung problems; now, that number is estimated to be around 3–5%, an improvement attributed to increased awareness and medications to manage symptoms.

Epidemiology
MG occurs in all ethnic groups and both sexes. It most commonly affects women under 40 and people from 50 to 70 years old of either sex, but it has been known to occur at any age. Younger people rarely have thymoma. Prevalence in the United States is estimated at between 0.5 and 20.4 cases per 100,000, with an estimated 60,000 Americans affected. In the United Kingdom, an estimated 15 cases of MG occur per 100,000 people.

History
The first to write about MG were Thomas Willis, Samuel Wilks, Erb, and Goldflam. The term "myasthenia gravis pseudo-paralytica" was proposed in 1895 by Jolly, a German physician. Mary Walker treated a person with MG with physostigmine in 1934. Simpson and Nastuck detailed the autoimmune nature of the condition. In 1973, Patrick and Lindstrom used rabbits to show that immunization with purified muscle-like acetylcholine receptors caused the development of MG-like symptoms.

Research
Immunomodulating substances, such as drugs that prevent acetylcholine receptor modulation by the immune system, are currently being researched. Some research recently has been on anti-c5 inhibitors for treatment research as they are safe and used in the treatment of other diseases. Ephedrine seems to benefit some people more than other medications, but it has not been properly studied as of 2014.
In the laboratory, MG is mostly studied in model organisms, such as rodents. In addition, in 2015, scientists developed an in vitro functional, all-human, neuromuscular junction assay from human embryonic stem cells and somatic-muscle stem cells. After the addition of pathogenic antibodies against the acetylcholine receptor and activation of the complement system, the neuromuscular co-culture shows symptoms such as weaker muscle contractions.

References

Further reading 
 
 

Autoimmune diseases
Myoneural junction and neuromuscular diseases
Wikipedia neurology articles ready to translate
Wikipedia medicine articles ready to translate